Choose Life is a 1985 album by Debby Boone.

Most of the songs on this album were written by Michael and Stormie Omartian; the former also produced the album.  The album peaked on the Top Contemporary Christian charts at No. 7.

Track listing
All tracks composed by Michael Omartian and Stormie Ormartian except where indicated:
 "The Time Is Now" [4:25]
 "Pressure Points"  [4:20]
 "Teach Me How to Love" [4:15]
 "When I Accepted You" [4:03]
 "Delight in Him"  [3:58]
 "Choose Life" [4:18]
 "The Heart of the Matter" [5:52]
 "Right for You" [4:22] (duet between Boone and Michael Omartian)
 "Song of Deliverance" (Boone, Wendell Burton, Marty Goetz) [3:57]
 "The Lord Is So Good" (Marty Goetz) [3:18]

Personnel
 Michael Omartian – Keyboards, arranger, percussion, background vocals
 Dara Lynn Bernard – Background vocals
 Joe Chemay – Bass
 Nathan East – Bass
 Khaliq Glover – Background vocals
 Marty Goetz – Piano
 John Guess – Engineer, mixing
 Steve Hall – Mastering
 Gary Herbig – Saxophone
 Abraham Laboriel – Bass
 Michael Landau – Guitar
 Paul Leim – Drums

References

1985 albums
Debby Boone albums
Albums produced by Michael Omartian